Lee's Summit is a city located within the counties of Jackson (primarily) and Cass in the U.S. state of Missouri. It is a suburb of Kansas City, Missouri. As of the 2020 census its population was 101,108, making it the sixth-largest city in both Missouri and in the Kansas City Metropolitan Area.

Origin of name

The "Town of Strother" (not to be confused with a town of the same name in Monroe County) was founded by William B. Howard in October 1865. He named it for his wife, Maria D. Strother, the daughter of William D. Strother formerly of Bardstown, Kentucky. Howard came to Jackson County in 1842 from Kentucky, married Maria in 1844, and by 1850 he and Maria had  and a homestead five miles (8 km) north of town. Howard was arrested for being a Confederate in October 1862, near the beginning of the Civil War, and after being paroled he took his family back to Kentucky for the duration of the war.

In November 1868, the town's name was changed to the "Town of Lee's Summit", most likely to honor early settler Dr. Pleasant John Graves Lea, who had moved to Jackson County in 1849 from Bradley County, Tennessee. Lea was listed as the postmaster of nearby Big Cedar in the 1855 United States Official Postal Guide. Dr. Lea was killed in August 1862 by Kansas Jayhawkers (or Redlegs).

When the surveyors for the Missouri Pacific Railroad came through, the local people and the railroad wanted to name the town in Dr. Lea's honor. He had a farm on the highest point and near the path of the tracks, and his murder had taken place near the site of the proposed depot. So they chose the name of "Lea's Summit", the "summit" portion to reflect its highest elevation on the Missouri Pacific Railroad between St. Louis and Kansas City. But they misspelled the name "Lees Summit" (with two "e's"; "Lee" instead of "Lea"; and leaving out the apostrophe) on a boxcar that was serving as a station and donated by the Missouri Pacific,  then a sign next to the tracks, and finally in the printed time schedule for the railroad. Legend states that the name was spelled wrong on the side of the Missouri Pacific depot and has remained Lee's Summit ever since.

Others claim that the town was named after famed Civil War General Robert E. Lee after Southerners began moving north into Missouri after the war due to the timing of General Lee's death compared to Dr. Lea's death. This is attributed to a quote in the Louisville Journal, January 3, 1866.

Since the name was already being circulated and published with two "e's", the town petitioned the state legislature and incorporated its name in 1868 as: "Town of Lee's Summit".

The spelling is unusual because apostrophes are typically not included in place names due to potential confusion regarding whether the place is owned by the namesake person. Most possessive place names lack an apostrophe, such as Harpers Ferry, West Virginia, and Boardmans Point, New Hampshire.

History
The growth of the town can be studied through historic Sanborn maps, which document building types and uses in the city during the late nineteenth and early twentieth centuries.

In 1913, R. A. Long, the owner of a lumber company, began building his estate, named Longview Farm, on the western edge of the city and into part of Kansas City. Harrison Metheny, grandfather of jazz legend Pat Metheny, was an electrician during the construction of Longview Farm. The farm also had a church, Longview Chapel Christian Church, which was completed in 1915. It soon became internationally known as a showplace farm. Today, one of the horse barns is home to Longview Farm Elementary. The church and mansion are on the National Register of Historic Places. Other parts of the farm have been turned into Longview Lake, Longview Community College, and a development called New Longview. Lee's Summit is also home to Missouri Town 1855 and Lee's Summit Historical Cemetery.

Geography

Lee's Summit is located at  (38.921601, −94.384763).

Demographics

As of the 2020 census, there were 101,108 people and 38,193 households in the city. The average number of persons per household was 2.62.

The estimated age distribution of the city was 6.0% under 5-years-old, 26.4% under 18-years-old, 58.5% between 18 and 65-years-old, and 15.1% over 65-years-old. The estimated sex distribution of the city was 51.7% female and 48.3% male. The estimated racial distribution of the city was 82.4% white, 8.6% Black or African American, 0.1% American Indian or Alaska Native, 2.1% Asian, 0.1% Native Hawaiian or other Pacific Islander, and 5.1% from two or more races. Hispanic or Latino of any race were 4.8% of the population. Persons with a disability, under 65-years-old made up 5.9% of the city.

The per capita income was $44,947. The median household income of the city was $98,960. The median value of owner-occupied housing units was $248,800. Persons in poverty made up an estimated 4.2% of the city.

2010 census
As of the 2010 census of 2010, there were 91,364 people, 34,429 households, and 25,126 families living in the city. The racial makeup of the city was 86.1% White, 8.4% African American, 0.3% Native American, 1.7% Asian, 0.1% Pacific Islander, 1.1% from other races, and 2.4% from two or more races. Hispanic or Latino of any race were 3.9% of the population.

There were 34,429 households, of which 39.5% had children under the age of 18 living with them, 58.3% were married couples living together, 10.9% had a female householder with no husband present, 3.8% had a male householder with no wife present, and 27.0% were non-families. Of all households, 22.8% were made up of individuals, and 8.9% had someone living alone who was 65 years of age or older. The average household size was 2.63 and the average family size was 3.11.

The median age in the city was 37.2 years. 28% of residents were under the age of 18; 7.1% were between the ages of 18 and 24; 27% were from 25 to 44; 26.6% were from 45 to 64; and 11.5% were 65 years of age or older. The sex makeup of the city was 47.9% male and 52.1% female.

2000 census
As of the 2000 census, there were 70,700 people, 26,417 households, and 19,495 families living in the city. The racial makeup of the city was 93.17% White, 3.47% African American, 0.36% Native American, 0.99% Asian, 0.06% Pacific Islander, 0.52% from other races, and 1.42% from two or more races. Hispanic or Latino of any race were 1.97% of the population.

There were 26,417 households, out of which 40.8% had children under the age of 18 living with them, 62.1% were married couples living together, 8.9% had a female householder with no husband present, and 26.2% were non-families. Of all households, 22.0% were made up of individuals, and 9.2% had someone living alone who was 65 years of age or older. The average household size was 2.65 and the average family size was 3.12.

In the city, 29.2% of the population was under the age of 18, 6.6% was from 18 to 24, 33.1% from 25 to 44, 20.9% from 45 to 64, and 10.2% was 65 years of age or older. The median age was 35 years. For every 100 females, there were 91.9 males. For every 100 females age 18 and over, there were 87.4 males.

The median income for a household in the city was $60,905, and the median income for a family was $70,702. Males had a median income of $49,385 versus $32,837 for females. The per capita income for the city was $26,891. About 2.8% of families and 3.8% of the population were below the poverty line, including 4.7% of those under age 18 and 4.7% of those age 65 or over.

Economy

Top employers
According to the town's Economic Development Council, the top employers in the city are:

City government 
Lee's Summit is a charter form of government, represented by a Mayor and a city council. Each of the four districts are represented by two councilmembers whose terms are staggered and expire every four years. No councilmember may serve more than two consecutive terms.

Mayor 

 William A. Baird

City council 

 District 1: Mia Prier, Hillary Shields
 District 2: John Lovell, Andrew S. Felker
 District 3: Phyllis Q. Edson, Beto Lopez
 District 4: Fred DeMoro, Faith Hodges

Education
Lee's Summit is served by parts of three public school districts: Lee's Summit R-VII School District, Blue Springs R-IV School District, Raymore-Peculiar R-II School District. Lee's Summit has four religious private schools as well: Summit Christian Academy (formerly Lee's Summit Community Christian School), Our Lady of Presentation Catholic School, Lee's Summit Academy (formerly Libby Lane Academy), and St. Michael the Archangel Catholic High School.  Longview Community College is located on the western edge of Lee's Summit and is part of Metropolitan Community College (Kansas City) system. It also is home to the Summit Technology Center which is a branch campus of the University of Central Missouri.

Lee's Summit has three public libraries, branches of the Mid-Continent Public Library, on Oldham Parkway, Colbern Road, and Blue Parkway.

Climate
Lee's Summit experiences a four-season humid continental climate (Köppen climate classification Dfa) with cold days and nights during the winter, and hot days and muggy nights during the summer.

Infrastructure

Transportation
The Historic Jefferson Highway (known as the "Palm to Pine" highway) runs through Lee's Summit.

Major roads
  I-470 is an Interstate 70 spur through Lee's Summit into southern Kansas City.
  US 40: Forms half of Lee's Summit's northern border with Independence.
  US 50: Follows I-435 from the west to I-470 then spurs off in Lee's Summit and becomes just US 50.
  Route 150: A highway linking southern Lee's Summit, and Grandview to the Kansas suburbs at State Line Road.
  Route 291: Formerly an eastern bypass route of US 71, the minor freeway connects Harrisonville and Lee's Summit to Independence, Sugar Creek, Liberty, KCI Airport and northern Kansas City. It fuses with I-470 through parts of Lee's Summit.
  Route 350: Connector highway that brings together I-435 with I-470 and US 50.

Other
 Lee's Summit (Amtrak station)
 Lee's Summit Municipal Airport

Healthcare
Two general medical and surgical hospitals which provide emergency services—Lee's Summit Medical Center and Saint Luke's East Hospital—are both located in Lee's Summit.

Media
 Lee's Summit Journal
 The Kansas City Star
 The Lee's Summit Tribune

In film
 The feature film All Roads Lead Home has parts filmed in Lee's Summit.
 The film Jesus Camp features footage of a children's prayer conference held at Christ Triumphant Church.
 Appears in a news article in the Star Trek episode, "The City on the Edge of Forever".
 The Netflix Series Ozark mentions Lee's Summit in its third season.

Notable people
 Megan Anderson, Australian mixed martial artist in the UFC
 Evan Boehm, NFL center for Miami Dolphins
 Paul Coverdell, former United States Senator from Georgia
 William S. Cowherd, former Mayor of Kansas City, Missouri
 Mark Curp, former half marathon world record holder
 Robert K. Dixon, Nobel Laureate, Presidential adviser and scientist
 Forrest Griffith, NFL halfback for New York Giants
 Monte Harrison, MLB center fielder for the Miami Marlins
 James Krause - American mixed martial artist in the UFC
 Alex Lange, MLB pitcher for Detroit Tigers
 Angela Lindvall, model and actress
 Audrey Lindvall, model
 Drew Lock, NFL quarterback for Seattle Seahawks
Katherine McNamara, actress on TV series Shadowhunters on Freeform as Clary Fray
The Merrell Twins, identical twin YouTubers, actresses, musicians and singers
Mike Metheny, jazz musician and journalist
Pat Metheny, jazz musician
Rick Roeber, expelled from the Missouri House of Representatives in a child abuse investigation
 Trevor Rosenthal, MLBpitcher 
 Sam B. Strother, former Mayor of Kansas City, Missouri
 Matt Tegenkamp, long-distance runner, U.S. Olympian
 Freddie Williams II, comic book artist
 Bob Younger, member of the James–Younger Gang
 Cole Younger, leader of the James–Younger Gang
 Jim Younger, member of the James–Younger Gang
 John Younger, member of the James–Younger Gang
Erik Palmer-Brown, soccer player

References

External links

 
 Lee's Summit Chamber of Commerce

 
Cities in Cass County, Missouri
Cities in Jackson County, Missouri
Cities in Kansas City metropolitan area
Populated places established in 1865
Cities in Missouri
1865 establishments in Missouri